Neacanista shirakii is a species of beetle in the family Cerambycidae. It was described by Mitono in 1943.

References

Acanthocinini
Beetles described in 1943